Obereisesheim transmitter was a facility of SWR used for mediumwave broadcasting on 711 kHz with a power of 5 kilowatts. It was located near Neckarsulm, Germany. Obereisesheim transmitter, which is situated at 49°11'28" N and 9°11'47" E, used as aerial a 74 metre tall ground-fed, insulated mast radiator, which was a lattice steel mast with triangular cross section and guyed in 3 levels. Obereisesheim transmitter worked on the same frequency as Ulm-Jungingen transmitter. It was switched off at 1 July 2011 and demolished in October 2018.

External links
 
 https://maps.google.com/maps?ie=UTF8&t=h&om=1&z=18&ll=49.191051,9.196812&spn=0.00149,0.003616

Former radio masts and towers
Radio masts and towers in Germany
2018 disestablishments in Germany
Buildings and structures demolished in 2018